Hurmudar-e Pain (also Romanized as Hūrmūdar-e Pā’īn) is a village in Fin Rural District, Fin District, Bandar Abbas County, Hormozgan Province, Iran. At the 2006 census, its population was 36, in 8 families.

References 

Populated places in Bandar Abbas County